Silver Jack Dam (National ID # CO01693) is a dam in Gunnison County, Colorado.

The earthen dam was constructed between 1966 and 1971 by the United States Bureau of Reclamation, with a height of 173 feet, 1050 feet long at its crest, and a morning glory spillway.  It impounds the East Fork Cimarron River for irrigation storage, as the main part of the larger Bostwick Park Project on the western slope.  The dam is owned by the Bureau and operated by the local Bostwick Park Water Conservancy District.

The reservoir it creates, Silver Jack Reservoir, has a normal water surface of 293 acres, and a maximum capacity of 12,820 acre-feet.  Recreation includes fishing, camping, boating, hunting, and hiking.

References 

Dams in Colorado
Reservoirs in Colorado
United States Bureau of Reclamation dams
Dams completed in 1971
Buildings and structures in Gunnison County, Colorado
Lakes of Gunnison County, Colorado